Muhibur Rahman Muhib is a politician from Patuakhali District of Bangladesh. He was elected a member of parliament from Patuakhali-4 in 2018 Bangladeshi general election.

Career 
Muhibur Rahman Muhib was the principal of Alhaj Jalal Uddin Degree College, Dhulasar, Kalapara, Patuakhali. He is serving as the Social Welfare Secretary of Kalapara Upazila Awami League and a member of the Central Committee of Bangladesh Awami Jubo League. He is the vice president of Patuakhali district Awami League.

He was elected as a member of parliament from Patuakhali-4 constituency as a candidate of Bangladesh Awami League in the Eleventh Parliamentary Election of 2018.

References 

Living people
Year of birth missing (living people)
People from Patuakhali district
Awami League politicians
11th Jatiya Sangsad members